The 2010 McNeese State Cowboys football team represented McNeese State University in the 2010 NCAA Division I FCS football season. The Cowboys were led by fifth-year head coach Matt Viator and played their home games at Cowboy Stadium as a member of the Southland Conference. They finished the season with six wins and five losses (6–5, 5–2 in Southland play).

Schedule

References

McNeese State
McNeese Cowboys football seasons
McNeese State Cowboys football